The West Indies cricket team toured Sri Lanka from 13 November to 3 December 2001. The tour consisted of three Test matches and the 2001 LG Abans Triangular Series, which also included Zimbabwe.

Squads

Test Series

1st Test

2nd Test

3rd Test

ODI Series
The ODI series was the 2001 LG Abans Triangular Series which also included Zimbabwe.

References

External links
 West Indies tour of Sri Lanka 2001/02, Cricinfo

2001 in West Indian cricket
2001 in Sri Lankan cricket
International cricket competitions in 2001–02
Sri Lankan cricket seasons from 2000–01
2001-02